Mixobrycon ribeiroi is a species of characin endemic to Paraguay, where it is found in the Paraguay River basin.  It is the only member of its genus.

Named in honor of Alípio de Miranda Ribeiro (1874-1939) a Brazilian ichthyologist-herpetologist.

References
 

Characidae
Monotypic fish genera
Fish of South America
Fish of Paraguay
Endemic fauna of Paraguay
Taxa named by Carl H. Eigenmann
Fish described in 1907